Pickwick is a British television musical made by the BBC in 1969 and based on the 1963 stage musical Pickwick, which in turn was based on the 1837 novel The Pickwick Papers written by Charles Dickens. It stars Harry Secombe as Samuel Pickwick and Roy Castle as Sam Weller.

This television production was based on the stage musical Pickwick which had been a commercial success. It was adapted for the screen by James Gilbert and Jimmy Grafton. The musical had been produced by Bernard Delfont and had premiered in the West End in 1963, again with Harry Secombe in the lead role and with choreography by Gillian Lynne.

Running at 90 minutes and made in colour, the TV musical again had lyrics by Leslie Bricusse and a score by Cyril Ornadel. The book was by Wolf Mankowitz and it was directed by Terry Hughes. The programme was first transmitted on 11 June 1969 and again on 26 December 1969. One of the better known songs from the score is "If I Ruled the World".

The cast of this production differed somewhat from that of the stage musical.

Plot
Set in England in 1828, the story centres on wealthy Samuel Pickwick and his valet Sam Weller, who are in a debtors' prison where they recall the misadventures that led to their imprisonment.

On the previous Christmas Eve, Pickwick introduced his friend Wardle, Wardle's daughters, Emily and Isabella, and their Aunt Rachael to Nathaniel Winkle, Augustus Snodgrass, and Tracy Tupman, three members of the Pickwick Club. They were soon joined by Alfred Jingle, who tricked Tupman into paying for his ticket to a ball that evening. Upon learning Rachael is an heiress, Jingle set out to win her hand and eventually succeeded.

Pickwick engages Sam Weller as his valet and, through a series of misunderstandings, he inadvertently leads his landlady, Mrs. Bardell, to believe he has proposed marriage to her. Pickwick is charged with breach of promise and hauled into court, where he is found guilty as charged and sentenced to prison when he stubbornly refuses to pay her compensation.

Cast list
Harry Secombe ... Mr. Pickwick
Roy Castle ... Sam Weller
Hattie Jacques ...  Mrs. Bardell
Aubrey Woods ...  Alfred Jingle
Bill Fraser ...  Serjeant Buzzfuzz
Julian Orchard ...  Augustus Snodgrass
Robert Dorning ...  Tracy Tupman 
Ian Trigger ...  Nathaniel Winkle   
Sheila White ...  Mary 
Michael Logan ...  Wardle 
Joyce Grant ...  Rachel 
Julia Sutton ...  Isabella 
Cheryl Kennedy ...  Emily 
Robert Yetzes ...  The Fat Boy 
Christopher Reynalds ...  Bardell Jr. 
Gertan Klauber ...  Landlord 
Erik Chitty ...  Judge 
Michael Darbyshire ...  Dodson 
Tony Sympson ...  Fogg 
Ian Gray ...  Serjeant Snubbin 
Michael Balfour ...  Roker

Archive status
Although the play still exists in full colour as its original videotape master, it has not been released onto VHS, DVD or Blu-ray, nor has it been made available on any streaming sites, including BBC iPlayer. A single clip, the opening titles, has been made available on the Ravensbourne University London website.

References

External links
Pickwick on the Ovrtur website
Pickwick (1969) on the British Film Institute website

1969 television films
1969 films
British television films
Compositions by Leslie Bricusse
Films based on The Pickwick Papers
Films set in 1828
Films with screenplays by Wolf Mankowitz